Shad Baghi may refer to:
 Shad Baghi, East Azerbaijan
 Shad Baghi, Markazi